Murilo Ribeiro de Almeida (born January 21, 1989) simply known as Murilo de Almeida, is a football player. He last played as a striker for Luverdense Esporte in the Campeonato Mato-Grossense. He is a former striker of the Timor-Leste national football team, and is the country's leading goal scorer.

Personal life
Murilo was born at Presidente Prudente, Brazil, and naturalized East Timorese by fellow Brazilian Antônio Carlos Vieira, who was then the coach of Timor-Leste.

Club career

Earlier career
Murilo de Almeida began his professional club career at Esporte Clube Bahia in Brazil but has not appeared in a single league match.

Persiraja
In 2011, he signed for Persiraja Banda Aceh. Murilo made his debut for Persiraja Banda Aceh in a match versus Persijap Jepara. He score at his opening match debut; In 69 minutes, Murilo make a surprised goal. Persiraja finished 2-1 with Persijap. Murilo de Almeida was sent off in the 16th minute, after a  protest  with the referee because of his excessive diving at the goal post in Persija IPL match. Referee reaction was pulling out two yellow cards.

Busaiteen
Between 2012 and 2013, he signed with and played for Busaiteen Club in the Bahraini Premier League. After his departure, in the 2013 edition of Bahraini Premier League was won by Busaiteen.

Magwe
In 2013, he moved to Myanmar and played for Magwe FC and scored 4 goals in 10 league matches.

Al-Mesaimeer and Ettifaq
During the 2013-14 Qatari Second Division, he represented Al-Mesaimeer SC and later moved to Saudi giants Al-Ettifaq FC in 2014. With Ettifaq, he played only 6 games in the Saudi Professional League.

Japanese leagues and Hongkong
In 2015, he signed with J1 League outfit Oita Trinita and later played for AC Nagano Parceiro in the J3 League on loan from Oita.

Murilo later moved to South China AA in the Hong Kong Premier League and also appeared with the club in 2015 AFC Cup.

Later career
Murilo came back to his previous club Busaiteen Club in the Bahraini Premier League and stayed there until 2016. He later moved to Kuwait and joined Al Tadhamon SC.

Chennai City
In 2017, he signed with Indian I-League club Chennai City FC on a two-year deal. He appeared in 8 I-League matches and scored a single goal against Churchill Brothers SC. He was also impressive in his team’s 2-1 victory over Mohun Bagan AC in January.

International career
Murilo made his international debut for Timor-Leste national under-23 football team in the 2011 SEA Games, where the first match was against Brunei U23. Murilo is known for his quick and fast attack. Murilo scored 3 goals during the 2011 SEA Games. Recently, Murilo received a red card for bad conduct during the third match which was against Vietnam U23. He scored 3 goals in 4 matches for the Timor-Leste U23 between 2011 and 2013.

Murilo made his senior international debut for Timor-Leste national football team on 5 October 2012, against Cambodia, where he struck twice late in the first half against Cambodia at the Youth Training Centre to set Timor Leste on the way to their first-ever win in the competition as he glanced home a cross by Alan and then finished off a counter-attack on the stroke of half-time. Timor-Leste won their first international match against Cambodia in which they scored 5–1.

He made his hat-trick against Brunei in the 2014 AFF Suzuki Cup group stages and honoured as the "Southeast Asia Player of the Week" by Goal.com and Goal Indonesia's CEO Eric Noveanto said that, "The Brazilian-born striker was an important figure for Timor Leste in AFF Suzuki Cup 2014 qualification round on Sunday as he successfully netted a hat-trick to clinch a 4-2 thrilling victory over Brunei at New National Stadium Laos."

He appeared in a total of 8 matches for the O Sol Nascente between 2012 and 2015 and scored 6 goals.

Career statistics

International goals
Scores and results list Timor-Leste's goal tally first.

See also
 Timor-Leste international footballers

References

External links

1989 births
Living people
People from Presidente Prudente, São Paulo
Brazilian footballers
Brazilian emigrants to East Timor
East Timorese footballers
East Timorese expatriate footballers
East Timorese expatriate sportspeople in Indonesia
East Timorese expatriate sportspeople in Qatar
East Timorese expatriate sportspeople in Japan
East Timorese expatriate sportspeople in Malaysia
Association football forwards
Timor-Leste international footballers
Brazilian expatriate footballers
Brazilian expatriate sportspeople in Indonesia
Brazilian expatriate sportspeople in Bahrain
Brazilian expatriate sportspeople in Myanmar
Brazilian expatriate sportspeople in Qatar
Brazilian expatriate sportspeople in Saudi Arabia
Brazilian expatriate sportspeople in Japan
Brazilian expatriate sportspeople in Hong Kong
Brazilian expatriate sportspeople in the United Arab Emirates
Brazilian expatriate sportspeople in Kuwait
Brazilian expatriate sportspeople in India
Brazilian expatriate sportspeople in Malaysia
Expatriate footballers in Indonesia
Expatriate footballers in Bahrain
Expatriate footballers in Myanmar
Expatriate footballers in Qatar
Expatriate footballers in Saudi Arabia
Expatriate footballers in Japan
Expatriate footballers in the United Arab Emirates
Expatriate footballers in Hong Kong
Expatriate footballers in Kuwait
Expatriate footballers in India
Expatriate footballers in Malaysia
J2 League players
J3 League players
Esporte Clube Bahia players
Persiraja Banda Aceh players
Busaiteen Club players
Magway FC players
Mesaimeer SC players
Ettifaq FC players
Oita Trinita players
AC Nagano Parceiro players
Al Dhaid SC players
South China AA players
Al Tadhamon SC players
Kuantan FA players
Chennai City FC players
Qatari Second Division players
Saudi Professional League players
UAE First Division League players
Kuwait Premier League players
Footballers from São Paulo (state)